The Macao Cultural Centre (CCM;) is a cultural centre in Sé, Macau, China.

History
The cultural centre was founded in 1999 with a cost of US$100 million. In August 2017, the roof of the cultural center was damaged due to Typhoon Hato.

Architecture
The cultural center is housed in a five-storey building with a total area of 45,000 m2.

Activities
The cultural center regularly hold musical performances.

See also
 List of museums in Macau
 Culture of Macau

References

External links

 

1999 establishments in Macau
Buildings and structures completed in 1999
Buildings and structures in Macau
Cultural centers in China
Sé, Macau